Trum y Ddysgl is a mountain in Snowdonia, north Wales and is the second highest summit on the celebrated Nantlle Ridge. It is also one half of the two Marilyns that make up the ridge, the other being Craig Cwm Silyn.

The mountain has a dramatic morphology, with two aretes, dark glacial cwms and rocky character. There are views of Snowdonia, with Mynydd Mawr, Yr Wyddfa and Moel Hebog being close neighbours. The peak also has 3 other tops, which all in all form a rocky and relatively narrow part of the Nantlle ridge.

References

Mountains and hills of Gwynedd
Mountains and hills of Snowdonia
Hewitts of Wales
Marilyns of Wales
Nuttalls